Icichthys lockingtoni, commonly known as the medusafish, is a species of medusafish native to the northern Pacific Ocean, where it ranges from Japan and the Gulf of Alaska to central Baja California in Mexico. It typically occurs at a depth of 0 to 91 m (0 to 299 ft), although it has been reported from as deep as 900 m (2953 ft). Young individuals of the species are abundant offshore, often in association with jellyfish in a symbiotic relationship that is likely commensal. The species reaches 46 cm (18.1 inches) in total length.

References 

Fish described in 1880
Centrolophidae
Fish of the Pacific Ocean